The 1926 Oklahoma gubernatorial election was held on November 2, 1926, and was a race for Governor of Oklahoma. Democrat  Henry S. Johnston defeated Republican Omer K. Benedict.  Also on the ballot were John Franing of the Farmer–Labor Party, E. H. H. Gates of the Socialist Party, and Independent Ed Boyle.

Democratic primary
Ten candidates vied for the Democratic nomination, including former governor James B. A. Robertson and Oklahoma City, OK Mayor O. A. Cargill.  Henry S. Johnston, who had been in the Oklahoma Senate since statehood including a term as the first President pro tempore, won the primary with a plurality.

Primary Results

Republican primary
Eight candidates sought the Republican nomination, with Omer K. Benedict winning with less than one-third of the total vote.

Results

Results

References

1926
Gubernatorial
Okla